Elton High School is a junior and senior high school in Elton, Louisiana, United States. It is a part of Jeff Davis Parish Public Schools.  it has 250 students.

Athletics
Elton High athletics competes in the LHSAA.

Championships
Football championships
(1) State Championship: 1970

Notable alumni
Al Woods, NFL player

References

External links
 

Schools in Jefferson Davis Parish, Louisiana
Public high schools in Louisiana
Public middle schools in Louisiana